The streamertails are hummingbirds in the genus Trochilus, that are endemic to Jamaica. It is the type genus of the family Trochilidae. Today most authorities consider the two taxa in this genus as separate species, but some (e.g. AOU) continue to treat them as conspecific, in which case scitulus is a subspecies of T. polytmus. A wide range of common names apply to this combined species, including green-and-black streamertail, Jamaican streamertail or simply streamertail. The name streamertail is a reference to the greatly elongated rectrices of the males.

Taxonomy and species list
The genus Trochilus was introduced in 1758 by the Swedish naturalist Carl Linnaeus in the tenth edition of his Systema Naturae. The genus name is from the Ancient Greek τροχιλος/trokhilos, a small unidentified bird mentioned by Aristotle. Later authors assumed the word referred to a wren.  The type species was subsequently designated as the red-billed streamertail. In his Systema Naturae Linnaeus included 18 species of hummingbird all of which he placed in Trochilus. Today, 12 of these species are still recognised, but only the red-billed streamertail is retained in its original genus. Two species are now placed in the genus.

References

 Schuchmann, K. L. (1999). Genus Trochilus. Pp. 572 in: del Hoyo, J., Elliott, A., & Sargatal, K. eds. (1999). Handbook of the Birds of the World.. Vol. 5. Barn-owls to Hummingbirds. Lynx Edicions, Barcelona. 

 
Higher-level bird taxa restricted to the West Indies
Endemic fauna of Jamaica
Taxonomy articles created by Polbot